Der Jüngste Tag, op.82, (Judgment Day) is an opera in three acts composed by Giselher Klebe.  His wife, Lore Klebe, wrote the libretto based on the play of the same name by Ödön von Horváth.

The opera premiered in 1980 at the Nationaltheater Mannheim, directed by Kurt Horres and conducted by Hans Wallat.

External links
Essay by Klebe on this opera 

German-language operas
Operas by Giselher Klebe
Operas
1980 operas
Operas based on plays